Crump's mouse (Diomys crumpi) is a species of rodent in the family Muridae.  It is the only species in the genus Diomys, and is found in northern India (recorded in Bihar and Manipur), southern Nepal (recorded in the Central Terai), and northern Myanmar (recorded in Namti).
Its natural habitat is subtropical or tropical dry forests.

References

Old World rats and mice
Rodents of India
Mammals of Nepal
Mammals described in 1917
Taxa named by Oldfield Thomas
Taxonomy articles created by Polbot